Confessions of an Actor is Laurence Olivier's autobiography.  It was published in 1982, seven years before the actor's death.

References

British autobiographies
Non-fiction books about acting
Show business memoirs
1982 non-fiction books
English-language books
Laurence Olivier